Island Lake is a lake in northeastern Manitoba in Canada, near the Ontario border. The lake is in the Hayes River drainage basin. The Island Lake River flows north from the northwest section of the lake into Gods Lake via Goose Lake and Beaver Lake. Gods Lake drains north through Gods River into the Hayes River.

A monument at the east end of the lake is a key point in the demarcation of the northeast–southwest boundary between Ontario and Manitoba.

Settlements 
Located on the lake are the First Nations communities of Wasagamack, St. Theresa Point and Garden Hill and the northern settlement of Island Lake which in 2011 had a combined population of 7,120.

Wasagamack had a population of 1,411 in the Canada Census of 2011 and St. Theresa Point had 2,871. Both are located on the western side of the lake. About 18 km (11 miles) east across the bay are Garden Hill with a population of 2,776 and nearby Island Lake with 62 residents. The northern settlement of Island Lake is located on several islands.

Gallery

Climate

See also
List of lakes of Manitoba

References

Lakes of Northern Manitoba
Borders of Manitoba
Borders of Ontario
Island Lake Region, Manitoba